The Beverly Road Historic District is a historic district consisting of fifteen residential buildings located between 23 and 45 Beverly Road in Grosse Pointe Farms, Michigan. It was listed on the National Register of Historic Places in 1995.

History
The Beverly Road Historic District covers the original area of the  Beverly Park Subdivision, platted by Henry B. Joy in 1911.  The district was one of the earliest upper-class subdivisions in the Grosse Pointes, and marked the change of the area from a farming and summer-home community into an upscale year-round community. Residents of the district included prominent company executives, businessmen, and lawyers such as William P. Hamilton, William Cornelius Crowley, Edwin R. Stroh, Sidney T. Miller, William Van Dyke, and Edwin B. Henry.  Beverly Road is still one of the few private streets in Grosse Pointe Farms.

Description
The structures in the district line both sides of Beverly Road from Lakeshore Drive to Grosse Pointe Boulevard.  The homes are primarily large-scale and feature high-quality workmanship and design.

References

External links

Historic Districts from Grosse Pointe Farms, MI, including pictures of Beverly Road.

American upper class
Historic districts in Wayne County, Michigan
Michigan State Historic Sites
Historic districts on the National Register of Historic Places in Michigan
National Register of Historic Places in Wayne County, Michigan